Paolo Barzman (born April 9, 1957) is a Canadian film, television director, and television writer.

Career

Directing
His television directing credits include The Adventures of the Black Stallion, Highlander: The Series, Counterstrike, Bordertown, Relic Hunter, Queen of Swords, 15/Love, 18 to Life, Lost Girl, Haven, Wynonna Earp, the American-Canadian adaptation of Being Human and SurrealEstate.

Barzman has also directed a number of television films. In 2007, he directed the feature film Emotional Arithmetic starring Susan Sarandon and Christopher Plummer.

Writing
As a television writer, he wrote for the series Grand Star and the French series Aventures Caraïbes.

References

External links

1957 births
Canadian film directors
Canadian television directors
Canadian television writers
Living people
Place of birth missing (living people)